Polynice is a surname. Notable people with the surname include:

Eniel Polynice (born 1988), American basketball player
Olden Polynice (born 1964), Haitian basketball player
Dieunika Polynice (born 2000), Haitian-Canadian author